Klovski Descent 7a is a skyscraper in Kyiv, Ukraine, the tallest in the country. Designed by Andriy Mazur, the building is 168 meters tall and has 47 floors. It is primarily a residential building but also has commercial uses.

Design and construction
The building was designed by Arkhitekturna Spilka and the studio of Serhiy Babushkin, who also conceived the Kyiv skyscrapers Parus Business Centre and Gulliver. 

The tower has been criticized for its adverse effect on the panorama of Kyiv Pechersk Lavra which is a protected UNESCO heritage site.

References

External links
 http://klovskiy7.com

Buildings and structures in Kyiv
Skyscrapers in Ukraine
Buildings and structures completed in 2012
Office buildings in Kyiv
Skyscraper office buildings